The battle of Melitopol was a military engagement between the Armed Forces of Ukraine and the  Armed Forces of Russia in the city of Melitopol, Zaporizhzhia Oblast. It was part of the southern Ukraine offensive of the 2022 Russian invasion of Ukraine. Russian forces attacked the city on 25 February, and captured it after heavy fighting by 1 March. After the battle ended, citizens held street protests against the military occupation. On 11 March, the city mayor was arrested by Russian troops for refusing to cooperate, but later released on 16 March in exchange for nine Russian prisoners of war.

Background 

Melitopol is the second largest city in Zaporizhzhia Oblast (region) after its capital, Zaporizhzhia. It is situated on the Molochna River that flows through the eastern edge of the city and into the Molochnyi Lyman, which eventually joins the Sea of Azov.

The city is located at the crossing of two major European highways, and there is also an electrified railway line of international importance that goes through the city. It was called "the gateway to the Crimea;” prior to the 2014 Russian occupation of Crimea 80% of passenger trains heading to the peninsula passed through the city and during summer road traffic would reach 45,000 vehicles per day.

Control of the city would allow Russian troops to advance towards Berdiansk and then to Mariupol, which would establish a land connection linking Crimea and the Donetsk People's Republic.

Battle 

At 10:30 on 25 February 2022, Russian forces reportedly entered Melitopol amid heavy clashes. According to the governor of Zaporizhzhia Oblast, Oleksandr Starukh, shells hit apartment buildings and intense street fighting occurred, with images of military equipment on Lomonosov Street emerging online and locals giving eyewitness accounts of fighting. Private houses in the area of Pishchanska Street were damaged.

Later in the morning, an armoured attack occurred that resulted in a fire and left vehicle trails in the streets as well as burnt cars. According to unofficial sources, the local city council offices were shelled and a screenshot of camera footage showed tanks rolling onto the city's main street. During the battle, Russian forces reportedly fired at a hospital, specifically an oncology centre, in the city, killing four people and injuring 10 others.

The city's leadership reportedly surrendered Melitopol later on 25 February, with Russian forces occupying the city. However, Ukrainian forces later launched a counterattack on the city, with locals reporting volleys of shelling and tanks with Russian national flags in the streets. Russia claimed on 26 February that it had taken the city, though James Heappey, the British Armed Forces Minister, said that it was still under Ukrainian control.

Later on 26 February, Russian forces raised Russian flags on administrative buildings in the city. Starukh stated that clashes still continued in the city, with firefights reported with local defense forces. He also stated that fighting between Russian and Ukrainian troops continued overnight, with 14 Ukrainian soldiers wounded. According to the mayor, Ivan Fedorov, utilities were disrupted and he confirmed the local oncology clinic had been damaged.

On 27 February, Russian troops shelled areas in and around the city. Citizens reported hearing gunfire in some areas of the city around 5:00 a.m. and, reportedly, squads of 150 people had been established to patrol the streets at night to "combat" mass looting. The following day, 28 February, the State Emergency Service of Ukraine in Zaporizhzhia Oblast stated that Russian airstrikes and shelling had damaged buildings of an emergency rescue unit, destroying some rescue equipment. Local self-defense forces were able to recapture the city hall building during the day, with mayor Ivan Fedorov saying that Russian troops had destroyed much of the building when it was initially captured. Reports of mass looting of retail stores continued.

On 1 March, after a brief reprieve, Russian forces began preparing to resume their attack on Melitopol and other cities. The mayor later stated that Melitopol had "not surrendered" but Russian forces had successfully occupied the city. Fedorov also highlighted the humanitarian situation in the city, saying people had problems withdrawing money from banks and he urged citizens to ration their supplies as issues replenishing stocks of gasoline, diesel fuel, gas, as well as food and medicines had yet to be resolved. A United States Department of Defense official also confirmed that Melitopol had been recaptured by Russian forces.

Aftermath

After the fall of the city, Melitopol came under a Russian military occupation.  Multiple protests occurred during the Russian occupation of the city.

On 13 March, the Melitopol City Council declared that, "The occupying troops of the Russian Federation are trying to illegally create an occupation administration of the city of Melitopol." It appealed to the Prosecutor General of Ukraine, Iryna Venediktova, to launch a pre-trial investigation into Danilchenko and her party Opposition Bloc for treason. Ukrayinska Pravda reported that the Russian military had abducted Melitopol's District Council Chairman Serhiy Priyma and had tried to abduct City Council Secretary Roman Romanov. Meanwhile, Russian military vehicles were seen announcing via loudspeakers that rallies and demonstrations had been prohibited and that a curfew was imposed from 6:00 pm to 6:00 am.

Ukraine claims that Russian forces are using T-62 tanks in the area of Melitopol.

References 

Melitopol
February 2022 events in Ukraine
March 2022 events in Ukraine
Melitopol
Southern Ukraine campaign